Henry Landers Bostick (born Henry Lipschitz) (January 12, 1895 – September 16, 1968) was an American Major League Baseball infielder. He played for the Philadelphia Athletics during the  season. He attended the University of Denver. He was Jewish.

References

External links

Major League Baseball infielders
Philadelphia Athletics players
Baseball players from Massachusetts
1895 births
1968 deaths
Denver Pioneers baseball players
Topeka Jayhawks players
University of Denver alumni
Jewish American baseball players
Jewish Major League Baseball players
20th-century American Jews